The Novgorod Constituency (No.134) is a Russian legislative constituency covering the entirety of Novgorod Oblast.

Members elected

Election results

1993

|-
! colspan=2 style="background-color:#E9E9E9;text-align:left;vertical-align:top;" |Candidate
! style="background-color:#E9E9E9;text-align:left;vertical-align:top;" |Party
! style="background-color:#E9E9E9;text-align:right;" |Votes
! style="background-color:#E9E9E9;text-align:right;" |%
|-
|style="background-color:#019CDC"|
|align=left|Oleg Ochin
|align=left|Party of Russian Unity and Accord
|
|29.41%
|-
|style="background-color:"|
|align=left|Leonid Dyakonov
|align=left|Independent
| -
|22.80%
|-
| colspan="5" style="background-color:#E9E9E9;"|
|- style="font-weight:bold"
| colspan="3" style="text-align:left;" | Total
| 
| 100%
|-
| colspan="5" style="background-color:#E9E9E9;"|
|- style="font-weight:bold"
| colspan="4" |Source:
|
|}

1995

|-
! colspan=2 style="background-color:#E9E9E9;text-align:left;vertical-align:top;" |Candidate
! style="background-color:#E9E9E9;text-align:left;vertical-align:top;" |Party
! style="background-color:#E9E9E9;text-align:right;" |Votes
! style="background-color:#E9E9E9;text-align:right;" |%
|-
|style="background-color:"|
|align=left|Yevgeny Zelenov
|align=left|Independent
|
|26.44%
|-
|style="background-color:"|
|align=left|Nikolay Bindyukov
|align=left|Communist Party
|
|13.96%
|-
|style="background-color:"|
|align=left|Anatoly Kuznetsov
|align=left|Independent
|
|13.50%
|-
|style="background-color:#E98282"|
|align=left|Natalya Malakhatkina
|align=left|Women of Russia
|
|10.61%
|-
|style="background-color:#019CDC"|
|align=left|Aleksandr Terentyev
|align=left|Party of Russian Unity and Accord
|
|10.42%
|-
|style="background-color:"|
|align=left|Vladimir Kondratyev
|align=left|Liberal Democratic Party
|
|9.92%
|-
|style="background-color:#000000"|
|colspan=2 |against all
|
|11.19%
|-
| colspan="5" style="background-color:#E9E9E9;"|
|- style="font-weight:bold"
| colspan="3" style="text-align:left;" | Total
| 
| 100%
|-
| colspan="5" style="background-color:#E9E9E9;"|
|- style="font-weight:bold"
| colspan="4" |Source:
|
|}

1999

|-
! colspan=2 style="background-color:#E9E9E9;text-align:left;vertical-align:top;" |Candidate
! style="background-color:#E9E9E9;text-align:left;vertical-align:top;" |Party
! style="background-color:#E9E9E9;text-align:right;" |Votes
! style="background-color:#E9E9E9;text-align:right;" |%
|-
|style="background-color:"|
|align=left|Yevgeny Zelenov (incumbent)
|align=left|Independent
|
|32.43%
|-
|style="background-color:"|
|align=left|Gennady Burbulis
|align=left|Independent
|
|24.83%
|-
|style="background-color:"|
|align=left|Nikolay Bindyukov
|align=left|Communist Party
|
|13.62%
|-
|style="background-color:"|
|align=left|Aleksandr Kostyukhin
|align=left|Yabloko
|
|6.08%
|-
|style="background-color:#1042A5"|
|align=left|Vladimir Ulyanov
|align=left|Union of Right Forces
|
|5.35%
|-
|style="background-color:#FF4400"|
|align=left|Nadezhda Lisitsyna
|align=left|Andrey Nikolayev and Svyatoslav Fyodorov Bloc
|
|3.30%
|-
|style="background-color:"|
|align=left|Gennady Khrolenko
|align=left|Independent
|
|1.88%
|-
|style="background-color:"|
|align=left|Viktor Berkunov
|align=left|Independent
|
|1.77%
|-
|style="background-color:"|
|align=left|Viktor Kukushkin
|align=left|Independent
|
|1.07%
|-
|style="background-color:"|
|align=left|Gennady Ignatyev
|align=left|Independent
|
|1.00%
|-
|style="background-color:#084284"|
|align=left|Vyacheslav Borovkov
|align=left|Spiritual Heritage
|
|0.43%
|-
|style="background-color:#000000"|
|colspan=2 |against all
|
|6.90%
|-
| colspan="5" style="background-color:#E9E9E9;"|
|- style="font-weight:bold"
| colspan="3" style="text-align:left;" | Total
| 
| 100%
|-
| colspan="5" style="background-color:#E9E9E9;"|
|- style="font-weight:bold"
| colspan="4" |Source:
|
|}

2003

|-
! colspan=2 style="background-color:#E9E9E9;text-align:left;vertical-align:top;" |Candidate
! style="background-color:#E9E9E9;text-align:left;vertical-align:top;" |Party
! style="background-color:#E9E9E9;text-align:right;" |Votes
! style="background-color:#E9E9E9;text-align:right;" |%
|-
|style="background-color:"|
|align=left|Aleksandr Filippov
|align=left|Independent
|
|35.43%
|-
|style="background-color:"|
|align=left|Yevgeny Zelenov (incumbent)
|align=left|United Russia
|
|24.97%
|-
|style="background-color:"|
|align=left|Valery Gaydym
|align=left|Communist Party
|
|14.71%
|-
|style="background-color:#00A1FF"|
|align=left|Nikolay Tikhomirov
|align=left|Party of Russia's Rebirth-Russian Party of Life
|
|5.34%
|-
|style="background-color:"|
|align=left|Vladimir Dugenets
|align=left|Independent
|
|3.13%
|-
|style="background-color:"|
|align=left|Tatyana Ivanova
|align=left|Liberal Democratic Party
|
|3.06%
|-
|style="background-color:"|
|align=left|Nikolay Velichansky
|align=left|Yabloko
|
|2.39%
|-
|style="background-color:#1042A5"|
|align=left|Irina Lebedeva
|align=left|Union of Right Forces
|
|2.06%
|-
|style="background-color:#164C8C"|
|align=left|Aleksandr Khudyakov
|align=left|United Russian Party Rus'
|
|0.40%
|-
|style="background-color:#7C73CC"|
|align=left|Oleg Nikitin
|align=left|Great Russia–Eurasian Union
|
|0.28%
|-
|style="background-color:#000000"|
|colspan=2 |against all
|
|7.23%
|-
| colspan="5" style="background-color:#E9E9E9;"|
|- style="font-weight:bold"
| colspan="3" style="text-align:left;" | Total
| 
| 100%
|-
| colspan="5" style="background-color:#E9E9E9;"|
|- style="font-weight:bold"
| colspan="4" |Source:
|
|}

2016

|-
! colspan=2 style="background-color:#E9E9E9;text-align:left;vertical-align:top;" |Candidate
! style="background-color:#E9E9E9;text-align:leftt;vertical-align:top;" |Party
! style="background-color:#E9E9E9;text-align:right;" |Votes
! style="background-color:#E9E9E9;text-align:right;" |%
|-
| style="background-color: " |
|align=left|Aleksandr Korovnikov
|align=left|United Russia
|
|37.33%
|-
|style="background:"| 
|align=left|Aleksey Afanasyev
|align=left|A Just Russia
|
|16.39%
|-
|style="background-color:"|
|align=left|Sergey Boyarov
|align=left|Liberal Democratic Party
|
|11.67%
|-
|style="background-color:"|
|align=left|Andrey Shustrov
|align=left|Communist Party
|
|11.15%
|-
|style="background:"| 
|align=left|Yevgeny Bogdanov
|align=left|Party of Growth
|
|6.26%
|-
|style="background:"| 
|align=left|Vyacheslav Ivanov
|align=left|Communists of Russia
|
|6.23%
|-
|style="background:"| 
|align=left|Konstantin Khivrich
|align=left|Yabloko
|
|3.58%
|-
|style="background:"| 
|align=left|Sergey Dobrovolsky
|align=left|People's Freedom Party
|
|2.00%
|-
|style="background:"| 
|align=left|Nikolay Stolyarov
|align=left|Civic Platform
|
|1.08%
|-
| colspan="5" style="background-color:#E9E9E9;"|
|- style="font-weight:bold"
| colspan="3" style="text-align:left;" | Total
| 
| 100%
|-
| colspan="5" style="background-color:#E9E9E9;"|
|- style="font-weight:bold"
| colspan="4" |Source:
|
|}

2019

|-
! colspan=2 style="background-color:#E9E9E9;text-align:left;vertical-align:top;" |Candidate
! style="background-color:#E9E9E9;text-align:left;vertical-align:top;" |Party
! style="background-color:#E9E9E9;text-align:right;" |Votes
! style="background-color:#E9E9E9;text-align:right;" |%
|-
|style="background-color: " |
|align=left|Yury Bobryshev
|align=left|United Russia
|40,293
|35.39%
|-
|style="background-color: " |
|align=left|Nina Ostanina
|align=left|Communist Party
|23,154
|20.33%
|-
|style="background-color: " |
|align=left|Dmitry Ignatov
|align=left|A Just Russia
|14,745
|12.95%
|-
|style="background-color: " |
|align=left|Anna Cherepanova
|align=left|Yabloko
|9,153
|8.04%
|-
|style="background-color: " |
|align=left|Aleksey Chursinov
|align=left|Liberal Democratic Party
|7,366
|6.47%
|-
|style="background-color: #ff2e2e" |
|align=left|Olga Yefimova
|align=left|Communist Party of Social Justice
|6,144
|5.40%
|-
|style="background-color:" |
|align=left|Aleksandr Grishin
|align=left|Party of Pensioners
|3,621
|3.18%
|-
|style="background-color: " |
|align=left|Dmitry Perevyazkin
|align=left|Communists of Russia
|2,483
|2.18%
|-
|style="background-color: " |
|align=left|Dmitry Tarasov
|align=left|Party of Growth
|2,131
|1.87%
|-
| colspan="5" style="background-color:#E9E9E9;"|
|- style="font-weight:bold"
| colspan="3" style="text-align:left;" | Total
| 113,865
| 100%
|-
| colspan="5" style="background-color:#E9E9E9;"|
|- style="font-weight:bold"
| colspan="4" |Source:
|
|}

2021

|-
! colspan=2 style="background-color:#E9E9E9;text-align:left;vertical-align:top;" |Candidate
! style="background-color:#E9E9E9;text-align:left;vertical-align:top;" |Party
! style="background-color:#E9E9E9;text-align:right;" |Votes
! style="background-color:#E9E9E9;text-align:right;" |%
|-
|style="background-color:"|
|align=left|Artyom Kiryanov
|align=left|United Russia
|
|27.18%
|-
|style="background-color: " |
|align=left|Aleksey Afanasyev
|align=left|A Just Russia — For Truth
|
|18.38%
|-
|style="background-color:"|
|align=left|Nikita Makarevich
|align=left|Communist Party
|
|15.51%
|-
|style="background-color:"|
|align=left|Aleksey Chursinov
|align=left|Liberal Democratic Party
|
|7.35%
|-
|style="background-color: "|
|align=left|Ilya Prikhodko
|align=left|New People
|
|6.58%
|-
|style="background-color: "|
|align=left|Nikolay Zakharov
|align=left|Party of Pensioners
|
|6.47%
|-
|style="background-color: " |
|align=left|Anna Cherepanova
|align=left|Yabloko
|
|5.85%
|-
|style="background-color: " |
|align=left|Dmitry Perevyazkin
|align=left|Communists of Russia
|
|4.50%
|-
|style="background-color:"|
|align=left|Yelena Maksimova
|align=left|The Greens
|
|3.43%
|-
| colspan="5" style="background-color:#E9E9E9;"|
|- style="font-weight:bold"
| colspan="3" style="text-align:left;" | Total
| 
| 100%
|-
| colspan="5" style="background-color:#E9E9E9;"|
|- style="font-weight:bold"
| colspan="4" |Source:
|
|}

Notes

References

Russian legislative constituencies
Politics of Novgorod Oblast